Jordan is an unincorporated community in Washington Township, Daviess County, Indiana.

It was named for a local family.

Geography

References

Unincorporated communities in Daviess County, Indiana
Unincorporated communities in Indiana